The Israel national rugby union team is governed by Rugby Israel, which oversees all rugby union in Israel. As of 24 January 2022, Israel is ranked 60th in the IRB World Rankings.

Their home ground is at the Wingate Institute in Netanya, Central District, known for its large number of immigrants from English-speaking countries.

History

The sport was brought to the country by British soldiers during the Mandate era, but petered out after the British left. A wave of immigration from English-speaking countries since 1967 has seen renewed interest in the sport, particularly in areas with large English-speaking populations such as Ra'anana and Jerusalem.

A national league was set up in 1972, and the Israel Rugby Union (now Rugby Israel) formed in 1975. Israel's first international match was away to Switzerland on 25 May 1981, and ended 9–9.

The Union joined the International Rugby Board in 1988, and participated in the European section of the qualifying rounds for the 1991 Rugby World Cup. In a group with Denmark, Sweden and Switzerland, Israel lost all three matches, but were by no means humiliated.

In the qualifying matches for the 1995 World Cup, Israel thrashed Hungary 67–8 in the preliminary round, before being knocked out in the Round 1 group stage, failing to score a point in two of their three games.

The qualifying matches for the 1999 Rugby World Cup followed the established pattern, with Israel being knocked out in the group stage, though they avoided finishing bottom of their five-team group by beating Austria.

The same happened in the 2003 WC qualifiers, where they finished fourth in a six team group. In the 2007 WC qualifiers they did not even make it to the group stage, being thrashed 113–7 on aggregate (0–53, 60–7) by Lithuania.

Israel beat Slovenia by 26–19 at 11 May 2009, but lost to Lithuania by 3–19 at 23 May 2009, ending their campaign for the 2011 Rugby World Cup qualifyings. These were the first ever games of Israel to be televised.

In the 2015 Rugby World Cup qualifyings, Israel won Division 2B of Europe qualification, defeating all opponents and being promoted to the play-off round.

Record

World Cup

European Competitions Since 2000

Overall

Recent Matches

Current squad
The following players were included in the squad for the 2021–22 Rugby Europe Conference South 1 match against Malta on 13 November 2021.

Head Coach:  Kevin Musikanth

Maccabiah Games
Israel is unique amongst the Maccabiah Games teams for two reasons, firstly it is the only true national team competing, and secondly, non-Jews who are Israeli citizens can qualify for it.

See also
Rugby union in Israel
 Israel national rugby sevens team

References

External links

Official
Rugby Israel website

Rugby Union Team, Israel National
European national rugby union teams
Asian national rugby union teams
Rugby union in Israel
Teams in European Nations Cup (rugby union)
Israel at the Maccabiah